Joseph Maxwell Miller (December 23, 1877 – February 20, 1933) was an American sculptor.

Biography
J. Maxwell Miller was born in Baltimore, Maryland on December 23, 1877. He studied at the Maryland Institute School of Art and Design and at the Rinehart School of Sculpture with William Rinehart in Baltimore.  He also studied with Raoul Verlet at the Julian Academy in Paris.

Miller was a member of the National Sculpture Society and exhibited at their 1923 exhibition where he showed a bas relief portrait of Daniel Coit Gilman and a number of medals.

He became the Director of the Rinehart School of Sculpture in 1923, a position he held for the last decade of his life.

Miller lived most of his life in Baltimore. He died at Union Memorial Hospital on February 20, 1933, and was buried at Green Mount Cemetery.

Miller's pupils included Mary Blackford Fowler.

Works
 Confederate Women's Monument, Baltimore, Maryland
 James Cardinal Gibbons Jubilee Medal, 1911 in the  Museum of American Art of the Pennsylvania Academy of Fine Art, Philadelphia, Pennsylvania
New Hannover County World War One Memorial, Wilmington, North Carolina.

References

1877 births
1933 deaths
Maryland Institute College of Art
Académie Julian alumni
Artists from Baltimore
20th-century American sculptors
20th-century American male artists
American male sculptors
National Sculpture Society members
Sculptors from Maryland
Burials at Green Mount Cemetery